At least four ships of the Argentine Navy have been named ARA San Juan:

 , an  launched in 1911 but requisitioned before completion by France in 1914 and renamed Temeraire
 , a survey vessel commissioned in 1928; she was renamed Comodoro Rivadavia in 1937 and Madryn in 1942; sold in 1967.
 , a  launched in 1937 and scrapped in 1973.
 , a  launched in 1983 and lost in 2017.

Citations

Sources
 
 

Argentine Navy ship names